Comin' Up Country is a Canadian country music television miniseries which aired on CBC Television in 1977.

Premise
Tim Daniels and Julia Lynn hosted this Halifax-produced series with bluegrass band Meadowgreen which was led by Vic Mullin. Various guest artists were also featured.

Scheduling
This hour-long series was broadcast Fridays at 9:00 p.m. (Eastern) from 6 to 27 May 1977.

References

External links
 

CBC Television original programming
1977 Canadian television series debuts
1977 Canadian television series endings